Snegur is a surname. It is a cognate of the Ukrainian surname Snihur/Snigur, meaning "bullfinch" (Pyrrhula). Notable people with the surname include:

 Georgeta Snegur (1937–2019), First Lady of Moldova, wife of Mircea
 Mircea Snegur (born 1939), first President of Moldova
 Natalia Snegur-Gherman (born 1969), Moldovan politician, daughter of Mircea

See also
 
 Snihur, a related surname

East Slavic-language surnames
Romanian-language surnames